Toronto Cricket, Skating and Curling Club Ground is a cricket ground in Toronto, Ontario, Canada.

In 1827 the Toronto Cricket Club was established in part by the efforts of George Anthony Barber. Cricket was joined by the Curling Club in 1836, and the Skating club sometime in the mid-1800s. The three clubs were amalgamated in 1957. The club also provides facilities for tennis and squash, amongst other sports.

The TCSCC is clearly the major ground, having hosted the Sahara Cups in the 1990s. Until September 2006, the cricket ground was the only ground in Canada approved to host official One Day Internationals. It was joined at this date by the Maple Leaf Cricket Club. Up until that point it had hosted 31 One-day internationals, most between India and Pakistan who played 16 games against each other at the venue. Canada played their first ODI there against Kenya in August 2006.

International record

One Day International centuries
Five ODI centuries have been scored at the venue.

One Day International five-wicket hauls
Six ODI five-wicket hauls have been taken at this venue.

See also 
 Maple Leaf Cricket Club

References

External links

 torontocricketclub
 Ground page at ESPN CricInfo
 cricketarchive
 worldstadiums

1827 establishments in Canada
Cricket grounds in Toronto
Sports venues in Toronto